The Roman Catholic Diocese of Malakal is a diocese in Malakal in the Ecclesiastical province of Juba in South Sudan.

History
 January 10, 1933: Established as Mission “sui iuris” of Kodok from Apostolic Vicariate of Khartoum
 August 4, 1938: Promoted as Apostolic Prefecture of Kodok 
 July 14, 1949: Renamed as Apostolic Prefecture of Malakal
 December 12, 1974: Promoted as Diocese of Malakal

Leadership
 Ecclesiastical Superior of Kodok (Roman rite) 
 Fr. Matteo Michelon, M.C.C.I. (1933.07.08 – 1935)
 Prefects Apostolic of Kodok (Roman rite)
 Fr. John Wall, M.H.M. (1938.08.12 – 1945)
 Fr. John Hart, M.H.M. (1947.06.13 – 1949.07.14 see below)
 Prefects Apostolic of Malakal (Roman rite) 
 Fr. John Hart, M.H.M. (see above 1949.07.14 – 1962)
 Fr. Herman Gerard Te Riele, M.H.M. (1962.05.29 – 1967)
 Prefects Apostolic of Malakal (Roman rite) 
 Fr. Pio Yukwan Deng (1967.08.19 – 1974.12.12 see below)
 Bishops of Malakal (Roman rite)
 Bishop Pio Yukwan Deng (see above 1974.12.12 – 1976.12.03)
 Bishop Vincent Mojwok Nyiker (1979.03.15 – 2009.05.16)
 Msgr. Roko Taban Mousa (Apostolic Administrator starting 2009)
 Bishop Stephen Nyodho Ador Majwok (2019.05.23 -)

See also
Roman Catholicism in South Sudan
Anglican Diocese of Malakal

Sources
 GCatholic.org
 Diocese of Malakal website

Malakal
Malakal
Christian organizations established in 1933
Roman Catholic dioceses and prelatures established in the 20th century
1933 establishments in Sudan
Roman Catholic bishops of Malakal